In the United States and Canada, Victor airways are low-altitude airways. They are defined in straight-line segments, each of which is based on a straight line between either two VHF omnidirectional range (VOR) stations, or a VOR and a VOR intersection, hence the beginning letter V (pronounced as Victor in the ICAO phonetic alphabet).

United States 
In the United States, Victor airways are designated by the FAA in FAA Order JO 7400.11.

Victor airways have minimum (and possibly maximum) altitudes for IFR operations established.

Victor airways are depicted as black solid lines on IFR Low-Altitude Enroute charts and as thick faded blue lines on VFR Terminal and Sectional Area charts. They are identified by a number, similar to an interstate highway (for example, a pilot could say that he/she is "flying Victor Eight").

The width of the victor corridor depends on the distance from the navigational aids (such as VORs):
When VORs are less than 102 nautical miles (NM) (189 km) from each other, the airway extends 4 NM (7.4 km) on either side of the centerline (8 NM (14.8 km) total width).
When VORs are more than 102 NM from each other, the width of the airway in the middle increases to account for the increased margin of error in the VOR signal. The width of the airway beyond 51 NM from a navaid is 4.5 degrees on either side of the centerline  (at 51 NM from a navaid, 4.5 degrees from the centerline of a radial is equivalent to 4 NM). The maximum width of the airway is at a designated changeover point between the two navaids, usually half way.

Canada 
Controlled low-level airways extend upwards from 2,200 ft AGL up to, but not including 18,000 ft ASL.

VHF/UHF airways 
The basic VHF/UHF airway width is at least 4 NM on each side of the centerline prescribed for such an airway, and is expanded along a line diverging 4.5° on each side of the centerline from the designated facility.

LF/MF airways 
The basic LF/MF airway width is at least 4.34 NM on each side of the centerline prescribed for such an airway, and is expanded along a line diverging 5° on each side of the centerline from the designated facility.

Mixed airways 
Where a Victor airway is established based on a VOR/VORTAC and NDB, the boundaries of that airway will be those of an LF/MF airway.

T-routes 
Low-level controlled fixed RNAV routes have dimensions of 4 NM of primary obstacle protection area, plus 2 NM of secondary obstacle protection area on each side of the centreline. The airspace associated with RNAV T-routes is 10 NM on each side of the centreline. RNAV T-route airspace and protection areas do not splay with distance from the waypoint.

References

External references
  (cited as 7400.2)
  (cited as 7400.11)
  (cited as TERPS)
  (cited as 8260.19)
  (cited as PHAK)

Radio navigation
Air navigation
Air traffic control
Aviation in Canada
Aviation in the United States
Airline routes